Giovanni Cazzetta (born 1957) is a Canadian outlaw biker and gangster who was a co-founder of the Rock Machine Motorcycle Club along with his brother Salvatore Cazzetta. He was also formerly a longtime member of the Outlaws Motorcycle Club in Quebec.

Giovanni Cazzetta joined the Outlaws at a young age and was involved in the events of the First Biker War. He remained a member of the organization in Quebec until 1984, when he left to join his brother Salvatore in the SS Motorcycle Club, also known as the SS Merciless Riders. Salvatore, along with Maurice "Mom" Boucher, was a leader the anti-immigration SS, which was under consideration for an invitation to join the Hells Angels. Following the Hells Angels' internal Lennoxville massacre  – which occurred when five senior members were ambushed and killed due to elements within the club's Montreal chapter suspecting they were embezzling club profits – the Cazzetta brothers and Boucher went their separate ways. According to true crime author RJ Parker, the massacre was met with distrust within other elements of Quebec's underworld. According to Parker, the Cazzetta brothers were closely related to a senior member of the Rizzuto crime family, and thus adopted the position that underworld members should not kill other members of their own club. So, where Boucher joined the Hells Angels, the Cazzettas formed their own motorcycle club, the Rock Machine, taking over turf formerly controlled by the weakened Montreal chapter of the Hells Angels. Giovanni Cazzetta would hold the position of second-in-command. Only his brother Salvatore would hold more influence.

According to Parker, the Hells Angels would not instigate any issue against the Rock Machine out of concern the powerful Rizzuto Family would intervene. He wrote that Boucher worked to rebuild his chapter's ties with other chapters and other underworld groups. Parker also wrote that Cazzetta too forged alliances, principally with the Bandidos, another powerful motorcycle club, and that he forged ties with cocaine cartels, and became one of Montreal's principal importers of cocaine.

In April 1992, Giovanni Cazzetta was arrested by police and charged with trafficking in narcotics after police found him to be in possession of three kilograms of cocaine worth around $120,000(modern equivalent when adjusting for inflation of $246,000 US).. He pleaded guilty to four charges the following spring and would be sentenced to four years in prison. Cazzetta was be released in 1997 and briefly led the Rock Machine during the Quebec Biker War against the Hells Angels. The Rock Machine's cocaine smuggling and distribution triggered extra police scrutiny, and 1994, his older brother Salvatore was also arrested with eleven tons of cocaine. Cazzetta's detention triggered Boucher to attack the remainder of he Rock Machine. The conflict lasted eight years, and many innocent bystanders were hurt or killed. While Salvatore was in prison during the war, Giovanni would be temporarily released.

Giovanni Cazzetta was released from prison in early 1997. He would return to the Rock Machine and was given the position of national president in his brother's absence, with Claude Vézina willing vacating the post. Cazzetta would lead the club through the conflict until May 1997, when was subject to a police sting operation in which a man from Alberta attempted to purchase fifteen kilograms of cocaine(valued at $600,000, adjusting for inflation the modern equivalent of $1,132,000).. This individual turned out to be an informant for the Crown. The drug mules Frank Bonneville and Donald Waite, who delivered the cocaine to the informant, were arrested and the narcotics seized by police. Vézina would return to his role as National president. Matticks, Bonneville and Waite pled guilty on 17 June 1997, and were sentenced to three, four, and two years' imprisonment respectively. Giovanni, now the leader of the Rock Machine, attempted to fight the charges brought against him, although he would lose these appeals and was sentenced to a nine-year prison term in April 1998. While  incarcerated, Cazzetta, who has never held any legitimate job, was found guilty of money laundering. He received five more years, to be run concurrently with his nine year sentence, and the Canadian government seized much of his assets, including his engraved Rock Machine gold ring, a 1994 Jeep Cherokee, a 1959 Corvette, and a 1992 Lexus.

By the time Salvatore Cazzetta had served his sentence, Boucher himself was serving a life sentence, the war was over, and the Rock Machine had been absorbed into the Bandidos, a merger with which he and his brother strongly disagreed. Salvatore Cazzetta chose to join the Hells Angels in 2005, and he would rise to lead the Hells Angels in Quebec. In May 2007, Giovanni Cazzetta was conditionally released.

References

1957 births
Living people
20th-century Canadian criminals
Canadian male criminals
Canadian gangsters of Italian descent
Canadian crime bosses
Canadian drug traffickers
Criminals from Montreal
Canadian prisoners and detainees
Prisoners and detainees of Canada
Canadian people convicted of drug offences
Organized crime in Montreal
Rock Machine Motorcycle Club